Between the Lines is a musical based on the novel of the same name, with music and lyrics by Elyssa Samsel and Kate Anderson, and a book by Timothy Allen McDonald.

Productions 
Between the Lines had its world premiere production at Kansas City Repetory Theatre. It opened on September 15, 2017, following previews from September 8. It played a limited run to October 1, 2017. Arielle Jacobs played the lead role of Delilah.

The show was scheduled to open Off-Broadway at the Tony Kiser Theatre in May 2020. The production was delayed twice, first to 2021, and then to 2022 due to the Covid-19 Pandemic. Between the Lines began previews on June 15, 2022, with an official opening on July 11. It was schedule to play until October 2, 2022, but closed early on September 11. A cast recording was released on January 13, 2023.

Musical numbers 

Act I
 "Another Chapter" – Delilah & Ensemble
 "Between the Lines" – Delilah & Oliver
 "Happily Ever After Hour" – Frump & Ensemble
 "When I'm Talking to Oliver" – Delilah & Ensemble
 "Mr Darcy and Me" – Ms. Winx
 "Inner Thoughts" – Allie, Janice, Martin, Mrs. Brown & Ryan
 "Start Again Tomorrow" – Grace
 "In My Perfect World" – Delilah & Oliver
 "Crazy Chemistry" – Allie & Ensemble
 "Butterflies" – Rapskullio
 "I'm Not Through" – Grace & Delilah
 "A Whole New Story" – Delilah

Act II
 "Best Day Ever" – Ensemble
 "In My Perfect World (reprise)" – Oliver & Delilah
 "Do It For You" – Ondine, Marina & Kyrie
 "Butterflies (reprise)" – Rapskullio
 "Something to Hold On To" – Oliver
 "Leaps and Bounds" – Grace
 "Out of Character" – Frump
 "Inner Thoughts (reprise)" – Allie, Janice, Martin & Ryan
 "Allie McAndrews" – Jules, Delilah & Ensemble
 "Can't Get 'Em Out" – Jessamyne, Delilah & Ensemble
 "Between the Lines (reprise)" – Delilah & Oliver
 "Say It In Other Words" – Delilah & Ensemble

Cast and characters

References 

Off-Broadway musicals
2017 musicals